Matej Žagar (born 3 April 1983 in Ljubljana, Slovenia) is a Slovenian motorcycle speedway rider who was won two Individual Speedway European Champion titles in 2004 and 2008. He is 18 times Slovenian Speedway Champion.

Career
In 2002, he won the 2002 Individual Speedway Junior European Championship and the following year made his debut in the Individual World Championship. 

He began his career in the United Kingdom with the Trelawny Tigers in 2003 before moving to the Reading Racers in 2004 when the Tigers closed. He became a permanent rider in the 2006 Speedway Grand Prix and 2007 Speedway Grand Prix seasons. In the UK he represented Reading, Swindon and Eastbourne before quitting the United Kingdom after an underwhelming 2010 campaign. He was touted as a potential GP wildcard for the 2012 SGP season following impressive and consistent performances in the Polish Extraliga with Gorzow, but turned down the opportunity to replace Darcy Ward due to the 1GP rider in the Extraliga and his contract with Gorzow, where 2010 world champion Tomasz Gollob was signed up. He returned to the UK after signing for the Belle Vue Aces in 2013 and rode for them until 2016.

In September 2014, during the Speedway Grand Prix Qualification he won the GP Challenge, which ensured that he claimed a permanent slot for the 2015 Grand Prix.

In August 2019, he won the GP Challenge for the second time in his career, which ensured that he claimed a permanent slot for the 2020 Speedway Grand Prix. He then became the first rider in history to win a third GP Challenge when he won it for a third time in 2020.

In 2021, after 9 consecutive Grand Prix seasons and finishing in 13th place he lost his permanent place in the Grand Prix World Championship but did ride in the 2022 season opener in his home country.

In 2022, he once again returned to the British speedway with the Belle Vue Aces and was part of the team that won the league title during the SGB Premiership 2022. Also in 2022, he helped SES win the 2022 Danish Super League.

Career highlights

Individual World Championship
 2003 - 30th place (5 points)
 2004 - 27th place (8 points)
 2005 - 16th place (23 points)
 2006 - 7th place (97 points)
 2007 - 14th place (54 points)
 2008 - 20th place (7 points)
 2009 - 19th place (7 points)
 2011 - 19th place (14 points)
 2013 - 7th place (110 points)
 2014 - 5th place (114 points) - including Finnish Grand prix win
 2015 - 6th place (107 points) - including Warsaw and Gorzow Grand Prix wins
 2016 - 9th place (90 points)
 2017 - 7th place (107 points) - including German and Scandinavian Grand Prix wins
 2018 - 10th place (79 points)
 2019 - 9th place (78 points)
 2020 - 11th place (46 points)
 2021 - 13th place (45 points)
 2022 - 18th place (11 points)

Individual U-21 World Championship
 2004 - 6th place (8 points)
 2004 - track reserve (1 point)
 2004 - 5th place (10 points)
 2004 - 3rd place (8 points and 3rd in Final)

Team World Championship
 2001 - 6 points in Preliminary Round 1
 2002 - 10th-11th place (5 points in Event 3)
 2003 - 9th place (13 points in Event 2)
 2004 - 9th-10th place (18 points in Qualifying Round 2)
 2005 - 9th-10th place (11 points in Qualifying Round 2)
 2006 - 9th-10th place (17 points in Qualifying Round 2)
 2007 - 13th-14th place (16 points in Qualifying Round 1)
 2008 - 11th-12th place 
 2009 - 4th place in Semi-finals (10 points in semi-final)
 2010 - 9th-10th place 
 2011 - 9th-10th place 
 2012 - 9th-10th place 
 2013 - 9th-10th place 
 2014 - 11th place 
 2015 - 11th place 
 2016 - 12th place

Individual European Championship
 2002 - 15th place (4 points)
 2003 - 4th place (10 points)
 2004 - European Champion (14+3 points)
 2006 - 17th place (0 points)
 2008 - European Champion (14 points)

Individual U-19 European Championship
 2000 - 11th place (8 points)
 2001 - track reserve (2 points)
 2002 - European Champion (15 points)

European Pairs Championship
 2005 - 3rd place (14 points)
 2006 - 2nd place (11 points)

Slovenian Championship
He is a 17 times champion of Slovenia in 2002, 2003, 2004, 2005, 2006, 2007, 2008, 2009, 2010, 2011, 2012, 2013, r>2014, 2015, 2016, 2017 and 2018.

Speedway Grand Prix results

See also 
 Slovenia national speedway team
 List of Speedway Grand Prix riders

References 

1983 births
Living people
Slovenian speedway riders
Individual Speedway European Champions
Individual Speedway Junior European Champions
Belle Vue Aces riders
Trelawny Tigers riders
Sportspeople from Ljubljana